Aeroflot Flight 3603 was a Tupolev Tu-154 operating a scheduled domestic passenger flight from Krasnoyarsk to Noril'sk, both in the Soviet Union, that crashed while attempting to land on 17 November 1981. Of the 167 passengers and crew on board, 99 were killed in the accident.

Accident
It was dark and there was a low overcast with a cloud base of around  when the Tupolev Tu-154 began its approach to Noril'sk Airport. The nose heavy condition caused Flight 3603 to descend through the glide path as it made its final approach. Flight 3603's captain initiated a go-around maneuver but the jetliner struck a mound approximately  short of the runway. Four crew members plus 95 passengers were killed in the accident.

Causes 
The primary cause of the accident was the failure of the crew to accurately calculate the appropriate landing weight, failing to align with the runway at the proper approach speed, failing to abort the landing and go-around in time, and failing to maintain control of the auto-throttle.

References

1981 in the Soviet Union
Aviation accidents and incidents in 1981
Aviation accidents and incidents caused by pilot error
Airliner accidents and incidents involving controlled flight into terrain
Aviation accidents and incidents in the Soviet Union
Accidents and incidents involving the Tupolev Tu-154
3603
November 1981 events in Europe